Rathgall, (Irish: An Ráth Gheal) or the Ring of the Rath is a large multivallate hill fort near the town of Shillelagh. Dating from the Bronze Age, it consists of three roughly concentric stone ramparts with a fourth masonry wall dating from the Medieval period at its centre. Rathgall is a National Monument which is in state care.

Excavations led by Barry Raftery in the 1970s the site are only partial, but yielded numerous artefacts including ceramic vessels, pot sherds and glass beads, which point to the middle to late Bronze Age activity on the site. A number of gold items have been found at the site also, as well as a burial site linked with later use of the site. Evidence of metal working comes from casts for tools and weapons, with burials pointing to a ritual element to the site beyond its agricultural and domestic use.

There are numerous legends that are associated with the site including fairies and as a site of pilgrimage for childless couples.

References

Further reading
 Becker, Katharina 2010. Rathgall, Co. Wicklow, Archaeology Ireland/Media House, Dublin
 Raftery, B. 1970a The Rathgall Hillfort, Co. Wicklow,  Antiquity 44. 51–54.
 Raftery, B. 1970b A Decorated Strap-end from Rathgall, Co. Wicklow, Journal Royal Society of Antiquaries of Ireland. 100. 200–211.
 Raftery, B. 1971 Rathgall, Co. Wicklow: 1970 excavations, Antiquity 45. 296–298.
 Raftery, B. 1973 Rathgall: a late Bronze Age burial in Ireland, Antiquity. 47
 Raftery, B. 1974  Rathgall, In Delaney (ed.) Excavations 1974: Summary Account of Archaeological Excavations in Ireland. Association of Young Irish Archaeologists, Ulster Archaeological Society and Group for the Study of Irish Historic Settlement. 40.
 Raftery, B. 1975-76 Rathgall, In Delaney (ed.) Excavations 1975-76: Summary Account of Archaeological Excavations in Ireland. Association of Young Irish Archaeologists, Ulster Archaeological Society and Group for the Study of Irish Historic Settlement. 42.
 Raftery, B. 1976 Rathgall and Irish Hillfort Problems, In D.W. Harding (ed.) Hillforts: Later Prehistoric Earthworks of Britain and Ireland, London: Academic Press. 339–357.
 Raftery, B. 1981 Iron Age Burials in Ireland in D. O Corrain (ed.), Irish Antiquity, 173–204.
 Waddell, J. 1998 The Prehistoric Archaeology of Ireland, Galway University Press. Galway. 270–273.

Hill forts in Ireland
National Monuments in County Wicklow